Iron filings are very small pieces of iron that look like a light powder.  As the name suggests, iron filings were traditionally obtained from metal working operations as the scrap material filed off larger iron and steel parts.  They are very often used in science demonstrations to show the direction of a magnetic field.  Since iron is a ferromagnetic material, a magnetic field induces each particle to become a tiny bar magnet. The south pole of each particle then attracts the north poles of its neighbors, and this process is repeated over a wide area creates chains of filings parallel to the direction of the magnetic field. Iron Filings are used in many places, including schools where they test the reaction of the filings to magnets. They are also used in some toys, most famously Wooly Willy, where they serve to mimic hair on a cartoon face.

See also

Coherer (Iron filings tube)

References

Iron